"Tonight I Wanna Cry" is a song co-written and recorded by Australian country music artist Keith Urban. It was released in November 2005 as the fifth and final single from his 2004 album Be Here.  The song peaked at number 2 on the U.S. Billboard Hot Country Songs chart. Urban wrote this song with Monty Powell.

Music video
The accompanying music video for this song was directed by Chris Hicky and premiered in early 2006.

In popular culture
The song was later sung by Ace Young on American Idol on 4 April 2006, which was designated a country music theme. Chad Doucette sang it on Canadian Idol. It was also covered by Chris Richardson on American Idol on 6 March 2007

Urban's version was also featured in the 31 January 2007 Medium episode, Very Merry Maggie.

In August 2011, The song was performed on the X Factor by contestant, Mitchell Callaway. Following this performance, Keith's version entered the Australian singles chart at #72.

In February 2013, The song was also performed on "American Idol" by Paul Jolley and Lazaro Arbos in front of Keith Urban himself during the "Sudden Death Round" in Las Vegas.

Chart performance
"Tonight I Wanna Cry" debuted at number 42 on the U.S. Billboard Hot Country Songs chart for the week of 3 December 2005.

Weekly charts

Year-end charts

Certifications and sales

References

2005 singles
Keith Urban songs
Song recordings produced by Dann Huff
Songs written by Monty Powell
Songs written by Keith Urban
Capitol Records Nashville singles
Music videos directed by Chris Hicky
2004 songs
Country ballads